Como tú no hay 2 (originally written as Como tú no hay dos English: No one like you), is a Spanish-language comedy-drama television series produced by W Studios and Lemon Studios for Televisa and Univision. It stars Adrián Uribe and Claudia Martín. The production of the series began on 26 September 2019 in Mexico City, Mexico.

On 10 January 2020, People en Español confirmed that the series is a new adaptation of the Chilean telenovela Amores de mercado, whose most recent version was ¿Quién es quién? produced in 2015. The series premiered in Mexico on 24 February 2020 on Las Estrellas.

An extended version of the series is available on Blim TV and has a total of 85 episodes.

Plot 
The series revolves around Toño (Adrián Uribe), who accidentally discovers that he possibly has a twin brother named Ricardo (Uribe), a high-class man who works at a large company. After Ricardo suffers an accident, Toño replaces him and lives an idyllic of love next to Natalia (Claudia Martín), a woman who was engaged to Ricardo. After the accident, Ricardo suffers from amnesia and begins a relationship with his neighbor Fabiana (Estefanía Hinojosa), a nice, simple, and honest young woman who has been in love with Tono since they were kids. Little by little, Ricardo suspects that the life he is living isn't his, and will try to discover the truth.

Cast

Main 
 Adrián Uribe as Antonio "Toño" Cortés Molina / Ricardo Reyes Alonso
 Claudia Martín as Natalia "Naty" Lira Vargas
 Azela Robinson as Luz María Molina de Cortés "Luchita"
 Ferdinando Valencia as Damián Fuentes Jasso
 Aylín Mújica as Oriana Jasso
 Alejandro Ávila as Germán Muñoz
 Sergio Reynoso as Félix Cortés "El Bacalao"
 María Fernanda García as Amelia Campos "La Pastora"
 María de la Fuente as Charlotte Burgos
 Gerardo Murguía as Claudio Reyes Alonso
 Lore Graniewicz as Renata Cortés
 Cecilia Romo as Doña Remedios
 Leticia Huijara as Sol Morales
 Henry Zakka as Federico "Fede" Mercurio
 Juan Pablo Gil as Adán Orozco Campos
 Jessica Díaz as Tina Rebolledo
 José Carlos Femat as Daniel Silva
 Juana Arias as Valeria Fuentes Jasso
 Gema Garoa as Luna Morales
 Gabriela Carrillo as Ivette Altamira
 Carlos Said as Luis Ramírez
 Lucía Silva as Mariana Díaz
 Giovanna Romo as Estrella Morales
 Héctor Holten as Edgar Orozco
 Mayra Rojas as Dora Sánchez
 Ramiro Tomasini as Diego
 Mario Alberto Monroy as Benjamín Cruz "Crucita"
 Estefanía Hinojosa as Fabiana Orozco Campos

Ratings

Mexico ratings 
 
}}

U.S. ratings 
  
}}

Episodes

Notes

References

External links 
 

Television series produced by Lemon Films
Television series produced by W Studios
2020 telenovelas
2020 Mexican television series debuts
Spanish-language telenovelas
Televisa telenovelas
2020 Mexican television series endings
Mexican telenovelas